Aleksei Sergeyevich Sukharev (born 11 January 2003) is a Russian football player.

Club career
Sukharev made his debut in the Russian Football National League for FC Avangard Kursk on 24 July 2019 in a game against FC Tom Tomsk.

On 16 June 2020, CSKA Moscow confirmed that Sukharev's loan deal with the club had ended and he'd left CSKA.

On 21 January 2021, a permanent transfer to CSKA has been confirmed by Avangard.

References

External links
 
 Profile by Russian Football National League
 
 

2003 births
Living people
Russian footballers
Association football defenders
FC Avangard Kursk players
PFC CSKA Moscow players
FC SKA Rostov-on-Don players